The Voice of Holland (season 1) was the first season of the Dutch reality singing competition, created by media tycoon John de Mol. The success of the show resulted in an international franchise called The Voice. It was aired from September 2010, to January 2011, on RTL4.

One of the important premises of the show is the quality of the singing talent. Four coaches, themselves popular performing artists, train the talents in their group and occasionally perform with them. Talents are selected in blind auditions, where the coaches cannot see, but only hear the auditioner.

The coaches were Jeroen van der Boom, Angela Groothuizen, Nick & Simon (working together) and Roel van Velzen. Martijn Krabbé was the only host in the debut season, Wendy van Dijk came to the live show on. The First Season ended on 21 January 2011, Ben Saunders was declared the winner, with Pearl Jozefzoon as runner-up. Saunders won by 59% of the votes. An average of 2.7 million people watched the show every Friday since its launch, while the final attracted 3,744,000 viewers. The results show broadcast half an hour later attracted 3,238,000. In total 30 of the show's singles reached the Top 100 download charts in the Netherlands, including 2 #1 chart toppers by winner Ben Saunders.

Summary of competitors
Competitors' table
 – Winner
 – Runner-up
 – Third place
 – Fourth place
 – Eliminated in Liveshows
 – Eliminated in Battles

Elimination chart

The Blind Auditions

Episode 1 

Simon (from Nick and Simon) pushed Jeroen's button during Ben Saunders audition.

Episode 2

Episode 3

Episode 4

Episode 5

Wildcard 

Coachs 
Aantal buzz 
Aantal keer gekozen 
Anatal Keren geweigerd 
Hij draaide zich niet om 
Alleen om te keren 
|Jeroen
|31 
|14 
|17 
|48
|8 
|Angela
|28 
|12 
|16 
|51 
|4
|Nick & Simon
|32 
|13 
|19 
|47 
|5 
|Roel
|29 
|15 
|14 
|50 
|3

The Battle

Advisors 

 – Battle Winner

The Sing Off

Live shows

Live show 1 
Competition performances

Non-competition performances

Live show 2 
Competition performances

Non-competition performances

Live show 3 
Competition performances

Non-competition performances

Live show 4 
Competition performances

Non-competition performances

Live show 5 
Competition performances

Non-competition performances

Live show 6 
Competition performances

Non-competition performances

Live show 7 
Competition performances

Non-competitieperformance

Semifinals 
Competition performances

Non-competition performances

Results show

Singles

Finals 
Competition performances

Non-competition performances

Results show

Celebrity performances

Ratings

The Voice: Real Life

Ik Ben Saunders

See also
 The Voice (TV series)

References

External links
 The Voice of Holland Official website

2010 Dutch television seasons
Season 01
2011 Dutch television seasons